Annoatok or Anoritooq, located at , was a small hunting station in Greenland on Smith Sound about  north of Etah. It is now abandoned.

History 
Annoatok was used as a base by Frederick Cook during his Arctic expedition of 1908–09, when he claimed to have reached the North Pole. The name Annoatok means "the wind-loved place". According to a publication of 1997 it has been the most northerly inhabited place on earth at that time. However, excavations carried out by Eric Holtved in Inuarfissuaq on 78,9° N in central Inglefield Land proved human settlement even farther north. Excavations during the years 2004 to 2005 gave evidence of an ancient settlement about 30 km farther north in Qaqaitsut on 79,2° N in Eastern Inglefield Land.

References 

Former populated places in Greenland